Dailuaine Halt railway station served the village of Carron, Scotland from 1933 to 1965 on the Strathspey Railway.

History 
The station opened on 18 November 1933 by the LNER. It was situated near Dailuaine distillery and 2.5 miles from Aberlour.
The station closed to both passengers on 18 October 1965.

References

External links 

Disused railway stations in Moray
Former London and North Eastern Railway stations
Railway stations in Great Britain opened in 1933
Railway stations in Great Britain closed in 1965
Beeching closures in Scotland
1933 establishments in Scotland
1965 disestablishments in Scotland